The Battle of Tullich, also known as the Battle of the Pass near Tullich, occurred on 10 February 1654 in Tullich, Scotland, during Glencairn's Rising. A Royalist force led by Ewen Cameron of Lochiel, under command of Glencairn, repulsed an attack by the numerically superior forces of Robert Lilburne.

Prelude
After the English defeated Charles II and his Scottish allies at Worcester in September 1651, the English Parliament moved to bring Scotland into the Commonwealth. In Scotland, there was significant resistance to being governed by the English, particularly in the Highlands where there remained considerable support for the exiled King.

In early 1653, King Charles made the Earl of Glencairn the temporary commander of Royalist forces in Scotland until Major-General Middleton could arrive from the Netherlands. As the commander of the Scottish Royalists, Glencairn worked to build support among the clan leaders in the Highlands and organized a guerrilla campaign against the English.

Battle
Supporting Glencairn in the campaign against the English was Ewen Cameron of Lochiel, the Scottish Highland chief of the Clan Cameron. At that time, Glencairn was in the Eastern Highlands campaigning against the occupying army of the English. Ewen and his clansmen were encamped at Tullich protecting Glencairn’s army against a surprise attack by the English.

During this time, the English army commanded by General Robert Lilburne was in pursuit of Glencairn and found their way to Tullich. When the English approached, Ewen sent a warning to Glencairn and prepared to defend the pass. The fighting started shortly thereafter and the Cameron clansmen stopped the English advance fending off several attacks. As the battle continued, the English also attempted to flank the Scots but failed.

After many hours of fighting and having inflicted heavy losses on the enemy, Ewen was ordered to retreat, leaving the pass open. The English at that time, however, were depleted and unable to continue their offensive in the harsh terrain. As the English fell back and attempted to return to Inverness, Ewen and his clansmen went on the offensive taking advantage of the situation pursuing and harassing the English for several miles.

Aftermath
Ewen returned in triumph to report back to Glencairn and was hailed as "The Deliverer of the Highland Army." Later, Ewen received a letter of praise for his courage in battle from King Charles.

Ian Mitchell's book On the Trail of Queen Victoria in the Highland is dedicated "to the Unknown Soldiers of Cromwell's Republic who fell in the Battle of Tullich near Ballater in 1654, overcoming bands of Royalist bandits under Locheil. Will we see their like again?"

References

External links
Battle of Tullich site record in the Royal Commission on the Ancient Historical Monuments of Scotland

Tullich
History of Aberdeenshire
1654 in Scotland
Conflicts in 1654